The Cheaters is a 1960–1962 TV series produced by The Danzigers. It revolved around John Hunter, insurance claims investigator for an insurance company. His immediate boss was Walter Allen.

Cast
John Ireland as John Hunter
Robert Ayres as Walter Allen
Ann Hanslip as Walter Allen's Secretary
Valentine Dyall as Inspector Kellogg of Scotland Yard
Reginald Marsh as Inspector Martin
Colin Tapley as Inspector

Episodes
Flash in the Sky
For the Price of Two
Green for Danger
The Hair of the Dog
A Question of Murder
The Rocker
The Safe Way
The Authentic McCoy
Diamond Studded Malaria
Intent to Defraud
Mighty Warrior
Single or Double Indemnity
Back of Beyond
The Fine Print
A Hood from Canada
Killian's Cut
Libel
The Man with the Ticking Head
Slope of Death
The Bite
A Case of Larceny
Lamb to the Slaughter
The Legacy
Legs---50,000 Each
Washday S.O.S.
The Weasel
Time to Kill
Murder Fugue
Obituary for a Champion
Fire!
The Man Who Wouldn't Be Paid
The Schemers
The Hands of Adrian
Affairs of the Heart
A Tale of Two Ships
The Dashing Major
Knight of the Road
Case of George Peterson
Carnival Case

Reception
According to BFI Screenonline "in missing a perfect opportunity to exploit the tough-cynical characteristics of the leading player, the 39 episodes moved with painful lethargy towards their predictable conclusions, with the most notable feature of this largely static series being John Ireland's carefully sustained somnambulistic performance."

References

External links
The Cheaters at IMDb
The Cheaters at TV Guide
The Cheaters at Danziger Fan Site

1960s British drama television series
1960 British television series debuts
1962 British television series endings